Lobsang Pandan (born 7 January 1996) is an Indian cricketer. He made his List A debut on 13 October 2019, for Arunachal Pradesh in the 2019–20 Vijay Hazare Trophy.

References

External links
 

1996 births
Living people
Indian cricketers
Arunachal Pradesh cricketers
Place of birth missing (living people)